The 1951/1952 News of the World Snooker Tournament was a professional snooker tournament sponsored by the News of the World. The tournament was won by Sidney Smith who won 6 of his 8 matches. He finished ahead of Albert Brown who also won 6 matches but won one fewer frame overall. The News of the World Snooker Tournament ran from 1949/50 to 1959.

Format
The 1951/52 event was a round-robin snooker tournament and was played from 10 September 1951 to 19 January 1952. All matches were played at Leicester Square Hall in London. There were 9 competitors, one more than previous years, and a total of 36 matches. The competitors were the 8 who had played in the previous year's event, Joe Davis, Fred Davis, Walter Donaldson, John Barrie, Albert Brown, Alec Brown, John Pulman, Jackie Rea, Sidney Smith, plus New Zealander Clark McConachy. Each match lasted three days and was the best of 37 frames.

Each match was separately handicapped. Joe Davis played level with Fred Davis and gave Walter Donaldson 7, John Pulman 18, Albert Brown, Alec Brown and Clark McConachy 21, Sidney Smith 24 and John Barrie 25. Fred Davis played level with Walter Donaldson and gave Sidney Smith 12, Albert Brown and Alec Brown and John Pulman 14, Clark McConachy 16 and John Barrie 18. Walter Donaldson gave Albert Brown and Sidney Smith 7, John Pulman 8, Clark McConachy 10, Alec Brown 14 and John Barrie 15. John Pulman played level with Alec Brown, Albert Brown, Sidney Smith and Clark McConachy and gave John Barrie 10. Sidney Smith played level with Albert Brown and Clark McConachy and gave Alec Brown 4 and John Barrie 10. Albert Brown played level with Albert Brown and Clark McConachy and gave John Barrie 10. Clark McConachy gave Alec Brown 7 and John Barrie 10. Alec Brown gave John Barrie 9.

Results
With three matches to be played there were three players with 5 wins. John Barrie had played all his matches and won 161 frames. Albert Brown and Sidney Smith each had one match left. Brown had won 149 frames while Smith had won 148. Albert Brown played Alec Brown in his last match. Alec Brown led 16–12 after the final afternoon session but Albert Brown won all 7 frames in the evening session to win 19–18.

After Albert Brown's 19–18 win, Sidney Smith needed to beat Walter Donaldson 21–16 to win the tournament. Smith led 16–14 after the final afternoon session but Donaldson won the first two frames on the final evening to tie the match at 16–16. Smith then won the last 5 frames to win the match 21–16 and take the tournament by a single frame, 169 to Brown's 168.

In the last match of the tournament Fred Davis beat brother Joe 20–17, playing on level terms. Fred had breaks of 108 and 101 on the second day.

Albert Brown had met Walter Donaldson earlier in January. Donaldson led 9–3 after the first day, scoring a break of 104 in the last frame  of the day. Brown made a break of 140 on the second evening but Donaldson increased his lead to 17–7 at the end of the day. On the final day Brown staged a comeback and won the first 7 frames of the day. Donaldson, however, held on and won the match 18–17.

Table

The positions were determined firstly by the number of matches won (MW) and, in the event of a tie, the number of frames won (FW).

Qualifying
With the main event starting earlier than in previous years, the qualifying tournament was also earlier and was held from 28 May to 16 June 1951. These matches were also played at Leicester Square Hall in London. There were 3 competitors: John Barrie, Kingsley Kennerley and Sydney Lee. Unlike the main event, each match lasted six  days and was the best of 73 frames. Barrie won both his matches to qualify. Kennerley beat Lee in the other match.

References

News of the World Snooker Tournament
News of the World Tournament
News of the World Tournament
News of the World Tournament
News of the World Tournament
News of the World Tournament
News of the World Tournament